This article presents the discography of the groups that American singer/guitarist Glen Campbell has played in.

Albums

Studio albums

Below are listed studio albums by groups of which Glen Campbell was a member at the time. These are all instrumental groups, featuring Campbell on (mainly 12 string) guitar.

Compilations and repackages

Singles

References

Glen Campbell
Pop music group discographies
Country music discographies